The history of the Jews in Tunisia extended nearly two thousand years and goes back to the Punic era. The Jewish community in Tunisia is no doubt older and grew up following successive waves of immigration and proselytism before its development was hampered by anti-Jewish measures in the Byzantine Empire. The community formerly used its own dialect of Arabic. After the Muslim conquest of Tunisia, Tunisian Judaism went through periods of relative freedom or even cultural apogee to times of more marked discrimination. The arrival of Jews expelled from the Iberian peninsula, often through Livorno, greatly altered the country. Its economic, social and cultural situation has improved markedly with the advent of the French protectorate before being compromised during the Second World War, with the occupation of the country by the Axis. The creation of Israel in 1948 provoked a widespread anti-Zionist reaction in the Arab world, to which was added nationalist agitation, nationalization of enterprises, Arabization of education and part of the administration. Jews left Tunisia en masse from the 1950s onwards because of the problems raised and the hostile climate created by the Bizerte crisis in 1961 and the Six-Day War in 1967. The Jewish population of Tunisia, estimated at about 105,000 individuals in 1948, numbered around 1,000 individuals as of 2019. These Jews lived mainly in Tunis, with communities present in Djerba.

The Jewish diaspora of Tunisia is divided between Israel and France, where it has preserved its community identity through its traditions, mostly dependent on Sephardic Judaism, but retaining its own specific characteristics. Djerbian Judaism in particular, considered to be more faithful to tradition because it remained outside the sphere of influence of the modernist currents, plays a dominant role. The vast majority of Tunisian Jews have relocated to Israel and have switched to using Hebrew as their home language. Tunisian Jews living in France typically use French as their first language, while the few still left in Tunisia tend to use either French or Judeo-Tunisian Arabic in their everyday lives.

Historiography 

The history of the Jews of Tunisia (until the establishment of the French protectorate) was first studied by David Cazès in 1888 in his Essay on the History of the Israelites of Tunisia; André Chouraqui (1952) and later by Haim Zeev Hirschberg (1965), in the more general context of North African Judaism. The research on the subject was then enriched by Robert Attal and Yitzhak Avrahami. In addition, various institutions, including the Israel Folktale Archives in University of Haifa, the Hebrew University of Jerusalem and the Ben Zvi Institute, collect material evidence (traditional clothing, embroidery, Lace, jewelry, etc.), traditions (folk tales, liturgical songs, etc.) and manuscripts as well as Judeo-Arabic books and newspapers. Paul Sebag is the first to provide in his History of the Jews of Tunisia: from origins to our days (1991) a first development entirely devoted to the history of this community. In Tunisia, following the thesis of Abdelkrim Allagui, a group under the direction of Habib Kazdaghli and Abdelhamid Largueche brings the subject into the field of national academic research. Founded in Paris on June 3, 1997, the Society of Jewish History of Tunisia contributes to the research on the Jews of Tunisia and transmits their history through conferences, symposia and exhibitions.

According to Michel Abitbol, the study of Judaism in Tunisia has grown rapidly during the progressive dissolution of the Jewish community in the context of decolonization and the evolution of the Arab-Israeli conflict while Habib Kazdaghli believes that the departure of the Jewish community is the cause of the low number of studies related to the topic. Kazdaghli, however, points out that their production increases since the 1990s, due to the authors attached to this community, and that the associations of Jews originating from one or another community (Ariana, Bizerte, etc.) or Tunisia multiply. As for the fate of the Jewish community during the period of the German occupation of Tunisia (1942–1943), it remains relatively uncommon, and the Symposium on the Jewish Community of Tunisia held at the University of La Manouba in February 1998 (the first of its kind on this research theme) does not mention it.  However, the work of memory of the community exists, with the testimonies of Robert Borgel and Paul Ghez, the novels "The Statue of Salt" by Albert Memmi and Villa Jasmin by Serge Moati as well as the works of some historians.

Antiquity

Hypothetical origins 
Like many Jewish populations, such as in Tripolitania and Spain, the Tunisian Jews claim a very old implantation on their territory. However, there is no record of their presence before the second century. Among the assumptions:

 Some historians, such as David Cazès, Nahum Slouschz or Alfred Louis Delattre, suggest on the basis of the biblical description of the close relations based on the maritime trade between Hiram (Phoenician king of Tire) and Solomon(king of Israel) could have been among the founders of Phoenician counters, including that of Carthage in 814 BC.
 One of the founding legends of the Jewish community of Djerba, transcribed for the first time in 1849, relates that the Kohens (members of the Jewish priestly class) would have settled in present-day Tunisia after the destruction of the Solomon's Temple by the Emperor Nebuchadnezzar II in 586 BC; They would have carried away a vestige of the destroyed Temple, preserved in the El Ghriba synagogue in Djerba, and would have made it a place of pilgrimage and veneration to the present day.
However, if these hypotheses were verified, it is probable that these Israelites would have assimilated to the Punic population and sacrificed to their divinities, like Baal and Tanit.  Thereafter, Jews from Alexandria or Cyrene could have settled in Carthage following the Hellenization of the eastern part of the Mediterranean Basin. The cultural context allowed them to practice Judaism more in keeping with ancestral traditions.  Small Jewish communities existed in the later days of Punic domination over North Africa, without it being possible to say whether they developed or disappeared later.
Jews have in any case settled in the new Roman province of Africa, enjoying the favors of Julius Caesar. The latter, in recognition of the support of King Antipater in his struggle against Pompey, recognized Judaism and the status of Religio licita, and according to Josephus granted the Jews a privileged status confirmed by the Magna Charta pro Judaeis under the Roman Empire. These Jews were joined by Jewish pilgrims, expelled from Rome for proselytizing, 20 by a number of defeated in the First Jewish–Roman War, deported and resold as slaves in North Africa, and also by Jews fleeing the repression of revolts in Cyrenaica and Judea under the reigns of the emperors Domitian, Trajan, and Hadrian. According to Josephus, the Romans deported 30,000 Jews to Carthage from Judea after the First Jewish-Roman War. It is very likely that these Jews founded communities on the territory of present-day Tunisia.

A tradition among the descendants of the first Jewish settlers was that their ancestors settled in that part of North Africa long before the destruction of the First Temple in the 6th century BCE. The ruins of an ancient synagogue dating back to the 3rd–5th century CE was discovered by the French captain Ernest De Prudhomme in his Hammam-Lif residence in 1883 called in Latin as sancta synagoga naronitana ("holy synagogue of Naro"). After the fall of the Second Temple, many exiled Jews settled in Tunis and engaged in agriculture, cattle-raising, and trade. They were divided into clans governed by their respective heads (mokdem), and had to pay the Romans a capitation tax of 2 shekels. Under the dominion of the Romans and (after 429) of the fairly tolerant Vandals, the Jews of Tunis increased and prospered to such a degree that early African church councils deemed it necessary to enact restrictive laws against them. After the overthrow of the Vandals by Belisarius in 534, Justinian I issued his edict of persecution in which the Jews were classed with the Arians and the Pagans. As elsewhere in the Roman Empire, the Jews of Roman Africa were romanized after hundreds of years of subjection and would have adopted Latinized names, worn the toga, and spoken Latin.

In the 7th century, the Jewish population was augmented by Spanish immigrants, who, fleeing from the persecutions of the Visigothic king Sisebut and his successors, escaped to Mauritania and settled in Byzantine cities.
Al-Qayrawani relates that at the time of the conquest of Hippo Zaritus (Arabic: Bizerta) by Hasan ibn al-Nu'man in 698 the governor of that district was a Jew. When Tunis came under the dominion of the Arabs, or of the Arabian caliphate of Baghdad, another influx of Arabic-speaking Jews from the Levant into Tunis took place.

Under Roman rule 

The first documents attesting to the presence of Jews in Tunisia date from the second century. Tertullian describes Jewish communities alongside which Pagan Jews of Punic, Roman and Berber origin and, initially, Christians; The success of Jewish proselytism led the pagan authorities to take legal measures, while Tertullian wrote a pamphlet against Judaism at the same time. On the other hand, the Talmud mention the existence of several Carthaginian rabbis. In addition, Alfred Louis Delattre demonstrates towards the end of the nineteenth century that the Gammarth necropolis, made up of 200 rock chambers, each containing up to 17 complex tombs (kokhim), contains Jewish symbols and funerary inscriptions in Hebrew, Latin and Greek.

A synagogue of the 2nd or 4th century, is discovered in Naro (present Hammam Lif) in 1883.  The mosaic covering the floor of the main hall, which includes a Latin inscription mentioning sancta synagoga naronitana ("holy synagogue of Naro") and motifs practiced throughout Roman Africa, testifies to the ease of its members and the quality of their exchanges with other populations.
Other Jewish communities are attested by epigraphic or literary references to Utique, Chemtou, Hadrumète or Thusuros (present Tozeur). Like the other Jews of the empire, those of Roman Africa are Romanized more or less long, bear Latin or Latin names, sport the gown and speak Latin, even if they retain the knowledge of Greek, Of the Jewish diaspora at the time.

According to St. Augustine, only their morals, modeled by Jewish religious precepts (circumcision, Kashrut, observance of Shabbat, modesty of dress), distinguish them from the rest of the population. On the intellectual level, they devote themselves to translation for Christian clients and to the study of the Law, many Rabbis were originally from Carthage. From an economic point of view, they worked in agriculture, livestock and trade. Their situation is modified from the edict of Milan (313) which legalized Christianity. Jews were gradually excluded from most public functions and proselytism was severely punished. The construction of new synagogues was forbidden towards the end of the fourth century and their maintenance without the agreement of the authorities, under a law of 423.
However, various councils held by the Church of Carthage, recommending Christians not to follow certain practices of their Jewish neighbors, testify to the maintenance of their influence.

From Vandal peace to Byzantine repression 

At the beginning of the 5th century the arrival of the Vandals has opened a period of respite for the Jews. The Arianism of the new masters of Roman Africa was closer to the Jewish religion than the Catholicism of the Church Fathers. The Jews probably thrived economically, backing the Vandal kings against the armies of Emperor Justinian, who had set out to conquer North Africa.

Justinian's victory in 535 opened the period of the Exarchate of Africa, which saw the persecution of the Jews with the Arians, the Donatists and the Gentiles. Stigmatized again, they are excluded from any public office, their synagogues are transformed into churches, their worship is proscribed and their meetings forbidden. The administration strictly applies the Codex Theodosianus against them, which allows the holding of forced conversions. If the emperor Maurice attempts to repeal these measures, his successors return there and an imperial edict imposes baptism on them.

Some Jews have fled the Byzantine-controlled cities to settle in the mountains or on the confines of the desert and fight there with the support of the Berber tribes, many of whom would have been won by their proselytism. According to other historians, the Judaization of the Berbers would have taken place four centuries earlier, with the arrival of Jews fleeing the repression of the Cyrenaic revolt; The transition would have been made progressively through a Judeo-Pagan syncretism with the cult of Tanit, still anchored after the fall of Carthage. Whatever the hypothesis, the historian of the fourteenth century Ibn Khaldun confirms their existence on the eve of the Muslim conquest of the Maghreb on the basis of eleventh-century Arab chronicles. However, this version is fairly questioned: Haim Zeev Hirschberg recalls that the historian wrote his work several centuries after the facts, Mohamed Talbi that the French translation is not totally exact since it does not render the idea of the contingency expressed by the author, and Gabriel Camps that the Jarawa and Nefzaouas quoted were of Christian confession before the arrival of Islam.

In any case, even if the hypothesis of the massive conversion of whole tribes appears fragile, individual conversions seem more probable.

Middle Ages

New status of Jews under Islam 

With the Arab conquest and the arrival of Islam in Tunisia in the eighth century, the "People of the Book" (including Jews and Christians) were given a choice between conversion to Islam (which some Jewish Berbers have done) and submission to the dhimma. The Dhimma is a pact of protection allowing the non-Muslims to practice their worship, to administer according to their laws and have their property and lives saved in return for the payment of the jizya, capitation tax levied on the free men, the wearing of distinctive clothing and the lack of construction of new places of worship. Moreover, dhimmis couldn't marry Muslim women – the reverse was possible if the Jewish wife converted and proselytized. They must also treat Muslims and Islam with respect and humility. Any violation of this pact resulted in expulsion or even death.

Jews were economically, culturally and linguistically integrated into society, while retaining their cultural and religious peculiarities. If it is slow, arabization is faster in urban areas, following the arrival of Jews from the East in the wake of the Arabs, and in the wealthy classes.

In 788, when Idris I of Morocco (Imam Idris) proclaimed Mauritania's independence of the Abbasid Caliphate of Baghdad, the Tunisian Jews joined his army under the leadership of their chief, Benjamin ben Joshaphat ben Abiezer. They soon withdrew, however; primarily because they were loath to fight against their coreligionists of other parts of Mauritania, who remained faithful to the caliphate of Baghdad; and secondarily, because of some indignities committed by Idris against Jewish women. The victorious Idris avenged this defection by attacking the Jews in their cities. The Jews were required to pay a capitation-tax and provide a certain number of virgins annually for Idris' harem. The Jewish tribe 'Ubaid Allah preferred to migrate to the east rather than to submit to Idris; according to a tradition, the Jews of the island of Djerba are the descendants of that tribe. In 793 Imam Idris was poisoned at the command of caliph Harun al-Rashid (it is said, by the governor's physician Shamma, probably a Jew), and circa 800 the Aghlabite dynasty was established. Under the rule of this dynasty, which lasted until 909, the situation of the Jews in Tunis was very favorable. As of old, Bizerta had a Jewish governor, and the political influence of the Jews made itself felt in the administration of the country. Especially prosperous at that time was the community of Kairwan (Kairouan), which was established soon after the foundation of that city by Uqba bin Nafi in the year 670.

A period of reaction set in with the accession of the Zirite Al-Mu'izz (1016–62), who persecuted all heterodox sects, as well as the Jews. The persecution was especially detrimental to the prosperity of the Kairwan community, and members thereof began to emigrate to the city of Tunis, which speedily gained in population and in commercial importance.

The accession of the Almohad dynasty to the throne of the Maghreb provinces in 1146 proved disastrous to the Jews of Tunis. The first Almohad, 'Abd al-Mu'min, claimed that Muhammad had permitted the Jews free exercise of their religion for only five hundred years, and had declared that if, after that period, the messiah had not come, they were to be forced to embrace Islam. Accordingly, Jews as well as Christians were compelled either to embrace Islam or to leave the country. 'Abd al-Mu'min's successors pursued the same course, and their severe measures resulted either in emigration or in forcible conversions. Soon becoming suspicious of the sincerity of the new converts, the Almohadis compelled them to wear a special garb, with a yellow cloth for a head-covering.

Cultural heyday of Tunisian Jews. 

The living conditions of the Jews were relatively favorable during the reign of the Aghlabids and then Fatimids dynasties. As evidenced by the archives of the Cairo Geniza, composed between 800 and 115041, the dhimma is practically limited to the jizya. Jews worked in the service of the dynasty, as treasurers, doctors or tax collectors but their situation remained precarious. Kairouan, now the capital of the Aghlabids, was the seat of the most important community in the territory, attracting migrants from Umayyad, Italy and the Abbasid Empire. This community would become one of the major poles of Judaism between the ninth and eleventh centuries, both economically, culturally and intellectually, ensuring, through correspondence with the Talmudic Academies in Babylonia, Lessons learned from Spain.

Many major figures of Judaism are associated with the city.  Among them is Isaac Israeli ben Solomon, a private doctor of the Aghlabide Ziadet Allah III and then of the Fatimids Abdullah al-Mahdi Billah and Al-Qa'im bi-Amr Allah and author of various medical treatises in Arabic which would enrich the medieval medicine through their translation by Constantine the African, adapting the teachings of the Alexandrian school to the Jewish dogma. Dunash ibn Tamim, is the author (or final editor) whose discipline is a philosophical commentary on the Sefer Yetzirah, where he developed conceptions close to his master's thought. Another disciple, Ishaq ibn Imran is considered the founder of the philosophical and medical school of Ifriqiya. Jacob ben Nissim ibn Shahin, rector of the Center of Studies at the end of the tenth century, is the official representative of the Talmudic academies of Babylonia, acting as intermediaries between them and his own community. His successor Chushiel ben Elchanan, originally from Bari, developed the simultaneous study of the Talmud of Babylon and the Jerusalem Talmud.  His son and disciple Chananel ben Chushiel was one of the major commentators of the Talmud in the Middle Ages. After his death, his work was continued by another disciple of his father whom Ignác Goldziher calls Jewish {Muʿtazila|mutazilite}: Nissim ben Jacob, the only one among the sages of Kairouan to bear the title of Gaon, also wrote an important commentary on the Talmud and the Hibbour yafe mehayeshoua, which is perhaps the first tales collection in Jewish literature.

On the political level, the community emancipated itself from the exile of Baghdad at the beginning of the eleventh century and acquired its first secular chief. Each community was placed under the authority of a council of notables headed by a chief (naggid) who, through the faithful, disposes of the resources necessary for the proper functioning of the various institutions: worship, schools, a tribunal headed by the rabbi- Judge (dayan), etc.  The maggid of Kairouan undoubtedly had the ascendancy over those of the communities of smaller size.

The Jews participate greatly in the exchanges with Al-Andalus, Egypt and the Middle East. Grouped in separate quarters (although many Jews settled in the Muslim districts of Kairouan during the Fatimid period), they had house of prayer, schools and a court.
The port cities of Mahdia, Sousse, Sfax and Gabès saw a steady influx of Jewish immigrants from the Levant to the end of the eleventh century, and their communities participated in these economic and intellectual exchanges. Monopolizing the goldsmiths' and jewelers' crafts, they also worked in the textile industry, as tailors, tanners and shoemakers, while the smallest rural communities practiced agriculture (saffron, henna, vine, etc.) or breeding of nomadic animals.

Under the Hafsids, Spanish and Ottomans (1236–1603) 
The departure of the Fatimids to Egypt in 972 led their Zirid vassals to seize power and eventually break their bonds of political and religious submission in the middle of the eleventh century. The Banu Hilal and the Banu Sulaym, were sent in retaliation against Tunisia by the Fatimids, took Kairouan in 1057 and plundered it, which empties it of all its population then plunges it into the doldrums. Combined with the triumph of Sunnism and the end of the Babylonian gaonate, these events marked the end of the Kairouan community and reversed the migratory flow of the Jewish populations towards the Levant, with the elites having already accompanied the Fatimid court in Cairo. Jews have migrated to the coastal cities of Gabes, Sfax, Mahdia, Sousse and Tunis, but also to Béjaïa, Tlemcen and Beni Hammad Fort.

Under the Hafsid dynasty, which was established in 1236 as a breakaway from the Almohad dynasty, the condition of the Jews greatly improved. Besides Kairwan, there were at that time important communities in Mehdia, Kalaa, the island of Djerba, and the city of Tunis. Considered at first as foreigners, the Jews were not permitted to settle in the interior of Tunis, but had to live in a building called a funduk. Subsequently, however, a wealthy and humane Muslim, Sidi Mahrez, who in 1159 had rendered great services to the Almohad caliph Abd al-Mu'min, obtained for them the right to settle in a special quarter of the city. This quarter, called the "Hira," constituted until 1857 the ghetto of Tunis; it was closed at night. In 1270, in consequence of the defeat of Louis IX of France, who had undertaken a crusade against Tunis, the cities of Kairwan and Ḥammat were declared holy; and the Jews were required either to leave them or to convert to Islam. From that year until the conquest of Tunis by France (1857), Jews and Christians were forbidden to pass a night in either of these cities; and only by special permission of the governor were they allowed to enter them during the day.

The rise of the Almohad Caliphate shaked both the Jewish communities of Tunisia and the Muslims attached to the cult of the saints, declared by the new sovereigns as heretics. Jews were forced to apostasy by Caliph Abd al-Mu'min. Many massacres took place, despite many formal conversions by the pronunciation of the Shahada. Indeed, many Jews, while outwardly professing Islam, remained faithful to their religion, which they observed in secret, as advocated by Rabbi Moses ben Maimon. Jewish practices disappeared from the Maghreb from 1165 to 1230; Still they were saddened by the sincere adherence of some to Islam, fears of persecution and the relativization of any religious affiliation. This Islamization of the morals and doctrines of the Jews of Tunisia, meant they as 'dhimmis' (after the disappearance of Christianity in the Maghreb around 1150) isolated from their other coreligionists, and was strongly criticized by the Maimonides.

Under the Hafsid dynasty, which emancipated from the Almohads and their religious doctrine in 1236, the Jews reconstituted the communities that existed before the Almohad period. The dhimma was strict, especially in matters of dress, but systematic persecution, social exclusion and hindrance to worship had disappeared. New trades appeared: carpenter, blacksmith, chiseler or soap-maker; Some worked in the service of power, striking money, collecting customs duties or translating.

Although the difficulty of the economic context leads to a surge of probabilism, the triumph of Maliki Sunnism with little tolerance towards the "people of the book" meant material and spiritual misery. The massive settlement of Jewish-Spanish scholars fleeing from the Castile in 1391 and again in 1492 was mainly carried out in Algeria and Morocco, and the Tunisian Jews, abandoned by this phenomenon, were led to consult Algerian scholars such as Simeon ben Zemah Duran.

In the 14th and 15th centuries, the Jews of Tunis were treated more cruelly than those elsewhere in the Maghreb. While refugees from Spain and Portugal flocked to Algeria and Morocco, only some chose to settle in Tunis. The Tunisian Jews had no eminent rabbis or scholars and had to consult those of Algeria or Morocco on religious questions. In the fifteenth century, each community was autonomous – recognized by power from the moment it counts at least ten major men – and has its own institutions; Their communal affairs were directed by a chief (zaken ha-yehudim) nominated by the government, and assisted by a council of notables (gdolei ha-qahal) made up of the most educated and wealthy family heads. The chief's functions consisted in the administration of justice among the Jews and collection of Jewish taxes.

Three kinds of taxes were imposed on Tunisian Jews:
 a communal tax, to which every member contributed according to his means;
 a personal or capitation tax (the jizya);
 a general tax, which was levied upon the Muslims also.

In addition to these, every Jewish tradesman and industrialist had to pay an annual tax to the guild. After the 13th century, taxes were collected by a qaid, who also served as an intermediary between the government and the Jews. His authority within the Jewish community was supreme. The members of the council of elders, as well as the rabbis, were nominated at his recommendation, and no rabbinical decision was valid unless approved by him.

During the conquest of Tunis by the Spaniards in 1535, many Jews were made prisoners and sold as slaves in several Christian countries. After the victory of the Ottomans over the Spaniards in 1574, Tunisia became a province of the Ottoman Empire led by deys, from 1591, then by beys, from 1640. In this context, Jews arriving from Italy have played an important role in the life of the country and in the history of Tunisian Judaism.

During the Spanish occupation of the Tunisian coasts (1535–74) the Jewish communities of Bizerte, Susa, Sfax, and other seaports suffered greatly at the hands of the conquerors; while under the subsequent Turkish rule the Jews of Tunis enjoyed a fair amount of security. They were free to practice their religion and administer their own affairs. Nevertheless, they were subject to the caprices of princes and outbursts of fanaticism. Petty officials were allowed to impose upon them the most difficult drudgery without compensation. They were obliged to wear a special costume, consisting of a blue frock without collar or ordinary sleeves (loose linen sleeves being substituted), wide linen drawers, black slippers, and a small black skull-cap; stockings might be worn in winter only. They might ride only on asses or mules, and were not permitted to use a saddle.

Beginning of the Modern Era 
From the 16th century Tunisia and more particularly Tunis had an influx of Jewish families of Spanish (Sephardi) origin, who initially settled in Livorno (Tuscany, Italy), and who later moved to work in other trading centers. These new settlers, called granas in Arabic or gorneyim (גורנים) in Hebrew after the name of the city in both languages, were wealthier than the Jewish natives called touensa. They spoke and wrote in Italian but gradually adopted the local Arabic while introducing their traditional liturgy in their newly host country.

Under the Muradids and Husainids (1603–1857) 
From the beginning of the 18th century the political status of the Jews in Tunis improved. This was due to the increasing influence of the political agents of the European powers, who, while seeking to ameliorate the condition of the Christian residents, had to plead also the cause of the Jews, whom Muslim legislation classed with Christians. Haim Joseph David Azulai, who visited Tunis in 1772, praised this development. In 1819, the United States consul in Tunis, Mordecai Manuel Noah, gave the following account of the situation of the Tunisian Jews:

"With all the apparent oppression, the Jews are the leading men; they are in Barbary the principal mechanics, they are at the head of the custom-house, they farm the revenues; the exportation of various articles, and the monopoly of various merchandise, are secured to them by purchase, they control the mint and regulate the coinage of money, they keep the bey's jewels and valuable articles, and are his treasurers, secretaries, and interpreters; the little known of arts, science, and medicine is confined to the Jews. If a Jew commits a crime, if the punishment affects his life, these people, so national, always purchase his pardon; the disgrace of one affects the whole community; they are ever in the presence of the bey, every minister has two or three Jewish agents, and when they unite to attain an object, it cannot be prevented. These people, then, whatever may be said of their oppression, possess a very controlling influence, their friendship is worthy of being preserved by public functionaries, and their opposition is to be dreaded."

Granas and Twansa 
Marrano families, which have been settling in Livorno from the end of the fifteenth century, converted back to Judaism
at the beginning of the seventeenth century, and left Tuscany to settle in Tunisia, in the framework of the establishment of commercial relations. These new arrivals, called 'Granas' in Arabic and 'Gorneyim' (גורנים) in Hebrew, were richer and less numerous than their indigenous coreligionists, called 'Twansa'. They spoke and wrote Tuscan and sometimes Spanish, and constituted a highly influential economic and cultural elite in the rest of the Italian community. Their surnames recalled their Spanish or Portuguese origin.

Quickly introduced to the Beylic Court, they performed executive functions of court – collectors of taxes, treasurers and intermediaries without authority over Muslims – and noble professions in medicine, finance or diplomacy. Even if they settled in the same neighborhoods, they had virtually no connection with the Twansa, to which Jews from the rest of the Mediterranean Basin have assimilated. The Twansa spoke the Judeo-Tunisian dialect, and occupied a modest social position. This is why, contrary to what was happening elsewhere in the Maghreb, these new populations were hardly accepted, which gradually leads to the division of the Jewish community into two groups.

In this context, the Jews played a major role in the economic life of the country, in commerce and crafts, but also in trading and banking. Despite the tariffs being higher than those paid by Muslim or Christian traders (10% vs. 3%), the Granas managed to control and prosper trade with Livorno. Their trading houses also engaged in credit banking activities and participated in the purchase of Christian slaves captured by privateers and resold. The Twansa saw themselves conceding the monopoly of the leather trade by the Muradid and then Husainid beys. Jews who were traveling as Tunisians worked in the retail trade in the souks of Tunis, thus shipping imported products from Europe under the leadership of a Muslim amine, or in the Jewish quarter.

In 1710, a century of friction between the two groups led to a coup de force of the Livornese community, with a tacit agreement of the authorities. By creating its own community institutions, it creates a schism with the indigenous population. Each of them had their council of notables, their grand rabbi, their rabbinical court, synagogues, schools, butcher's shop and a separate cemetery. This state of affairs was endorsed by a taqqana (rabbinic decree) signed in July 1741 between the great rabbis Abraham Taïeb and Isaac Lumbroso. This agreement was renewed in 1784 before being annulled in 1899. This taqqana sets, among other rules, the fact that every Israelite from a Muslim country was attached to the Twansa, while every Israelite from a Christian country was from the Granas. Moreover, the Granas – a richer community, although only 8% of the total population – then accounted for one third of the payment of the jizya against two-thirds for the Twansa. This last point indicated that the Livornese community, previously protected by the European consuls, has sufficiently integrated into Tunisia so that its members were considered dhimmis and taxed like the Twansa.

The socio-cultural and economic differences between these two communities have increased in the nineteenth century. The Granas, due to their European origins and higher standard of living, but also to their economic, family and cultural ties with Livorno, found it difficult to cope with their indigenous coreligionists, the Twansa, who were considered less "civilized". The Granas were an important contributions whereas they represented only a minority of the Jews of Tunisia. On the other hand, indigenous elites didn't wish to give up their power to newcomers, unlike their Maghreb neighbors, probably due to the later arrival of the Granas in Tunisia. The Granas also differed geographically from the Twansa, settling in the European district of Tunis, thus avoiding the Hara, and more culturally approach the Europeans than their co-religionists. However, the two groups keep the same rites and uses with only a few variants and, outside Tunis, the same community institutions continue to serve all the faithful. Moreover, all the Jews remain under the authority of a single qaid chosen from the Twansa, presumably to avoid interference with foreigners.

Bullying and discrimination 
During the seventeenth and eighteenth centuries, Jews were still subjected to bullying and discriminatory measures, particularly on the part of the judicial system which was arbitrary in their regard, with the exception of the more tolerant Hanafi courts. Jews were still subjected to the collective payment of the jizya – the annual amount of which varied according to the year, from 10,332 piastres in 1756 to 4,572 piastres in 1806 – and had to pay additional taxes (ghrâma) whenever the sovereign's treasury was in difficulty, as the Muslims sometimes did. Moreover, they were periodically obliged to carry out public works and were subjected to forced labor which affected mainly the poorest of the communities. Regarding dress code, the chechia that served as their headdress had to be black and wrapped in a dark turban, unlike the Muslims who wore a red chechia surrounded by a white turban. The Granas, dressed in European fashion, wore wigs and round hats like Christian merchants.

At the beginning of the eighteenth century, the political status of the Jews improved somewhat thanks to the growing influence of the political agents of the European powers who, seeking to improve the living conditions of the Christian residents, also pleaded the Jews. But if the wealthy Jews – who held positions in administration or trade – succeeded in being respected, especially through the protection of influential Muslim personalities, poor Jews were often victims of bullying and even murder, and the authorities didn't seem to intervene. An observer declared that the Jews were recognized "not only in their black costume, but also in the imprint of a curse they carry on their foreheads".

At the end of the eighteenth century, Hammouda Pasha denied Jews the right to acquire and possess real estate properties, while the learning of literal Arabic and the use of the Arabic alphabet was also prohibited during this period. Finally, the behavior of the Muslim population towards the communities varied from the will to rigorous application of the dhimma by the Ulama to the absence of hostility of the rural population, marginalized urban fringes but assured of impunity.

Internal split and development

Leaders 
Communities were structured under the authority of a leader of the "Jewish nation" with the title of hasar ve ha-tafsar, a prestigious and powerful post containing both the qaid charge of the Jews (qdyd el yihud) and that of Receiver General of Finance under the authority of the Treasurer of the Kingdom (khaznadar). He was an intermediary between the bey and his community and therefore enjoyed entry to the court. He had a very important bureaucratic power over those coreligionaries in whom he apportioned the payment of the jizya – of which they were collectively liable – according to the resources of each household. It also refers to those who performed the duties imposed by the authorities.

A state farmer, surrounded by some of the most fortunate and educated notables, also collected taxes such as the tithes, the tax on kosher meat and the offerings of the faithful. These allow him to pay for his services, those of his deputies and the rabbis-judges104 and finance the synagogues, the schools linked to them, the ritual abattoir, the cemetery, the relief fund for the needy and the sick and the rabbinical court, which were only in large cities under the presidency of the Grand Rabbi. Administrator of the affairs of the community designated the local secular or religious leaders – with the written approval of the Tunisian authorities – and gives them broad orientations. From the reign of Abu l-Hasan Ali I(1735–1756), he also served as treasurer of the Bey and many of the key posts in the administration of finance – collection of taxes and customs duties, scheduling of expenditure, Handling of cash, keeping books of account or paying the salaries of the Janissaries – were occupied by Jewish agents.

Religious authorities 

Despite the split between the groups, the figure of the Grand Rabbi had considerable authority among his followers. By virtue of his function as president of the rabbinical court, he watches over Jewish law, relying on the Shulchan Aruch, the standard legislative code, and the Talmud. The rabbinic jurisdictions deal with personal status matters, but also with civil and commercial cases when only Jews were concerned, whether the faults were religious or secular. In small towns, the dayan was responsible for rendering justice, with the rabbinical court serving as a chamber of appeal. One of the most rigorous penalties that the latter could pronounce was the herem, the Jewish version of excommunication, made public in the synagogue.

However, some questioned the authority of the religious leaders: a Jewish broker, working for a French trading house and condemned to beating in May 1827 for invoking the name of God, appealed the decision to the consul of France. Following the protest of the latter to the bey, it was decided that the rabbinical court would no longer pronounce sentence for religious offense to a Jew placed under French protection.

Renewal of ideas 
On the intellectual level, the growing exchanges between Jews from Tunisia and Livorno facilitated the circulation of printed works in Tuscany and their widespread distribution in Tunisia and the rest of the Maghreb. This led to an important revival of the Tunisian Hebrew studies at the beginning of the eighteenth century, embodied in particular by the rabbis Semah Sarfati, Abraham Ha-Cohen, Abraham Benmoussa, Abraham Taïeb and Joseph Cohen-Tanugi. Among the works of the Chumash, the Talmud or the Kabbalah, which are of note, we can cite;
 Toafot Re'em (1761–1762) and Meira Dakhiya (1792) by Mordecai Baruch Carvalho, commentary on the work of Elijah Mizrachi and a collection of glosses on various Talmudic treatises;
 Zera Itshak (1768) by Isaac Lumbroso, an important Talmudic commentary;
 Hoq Nathan (1776) by Nathan Borgel, an important Talmudic commentary;
 Migdanot Nathan (1778–1785) by Élie Borgel, series of commentaries on Talmudic treatises;
 Yeter ha-Baz (1787) by Nehorai Jarmon, new on the Talmud and the Mishneh Torah of Moses Maimonides
 Erekh ha-Shoulhan (1791–1891) by Isaac Taïeb, a book dealing with the laws and commenting on the Shulchan Aruch
 Mishha di-Ributa (1805) by Messaoud-Raphael El-Fassi, an important commentary by Choulhan Aroukh, accompanied by works by his sons Haym and Solomon;
 Mishkenot ha-roim (1860) and Hayyim va-Chesed (1873) by Ouziel El-Haik, a collection of 1,499 responses on the most diverse subjects and a collection of homilies and funeral eulogies pronounced from 1767 to 1810.

With the exception of Isaac Lumbroso's Zera Itshak, all the works were printed in Livorno, Tunis, which didn't have a well-known printing press, the only attempt to make one was in 1768 was considered a failure because of the lack of knowledge on the subject. Rabbi Chaim Yosef David Azulai, who visited Tunis in 1773–74, noted that the city had some 300 young talmudists and considered that the rabbis he met "had very extensive knowledge".

Aborted reforms of the nineteenth century

Inventory 
By the middle of the century, the Jews of Tunisia barely knew any literate Arabic, and few of them read and wrote Hebrew. In addition, they generally lived with their precepts, because of their only religious instruction and they have little knowledge of the Arab-Muslim letters, unlike the Jews of other Muslim countries. Nevertheless, the comings and goings between Tunis and Europe contributed to a certain desire for emancipation and freedom in wearing the clothes assigned to them; in January 1823 Mahmoud Bey has ordered all Jews living in Tunisia to wear a cap.

One Jew originally from Gibraltar who refuses to measure, was the victim of a bastinado; His protest to his consul led to a strong reaction from the United Kingdom. This situation was beneficial to the Granas, who obtained permission to pay to replace the chechia with a white cap (kbîbes) and the wearing of a sefseri specific for their women, as a way to distinguish themselves from the Twansa who still had to wear the black cap. However, this concession contradicted with a relative hardening of the authorities during the first decades of the century, as reported by the doctor of the bey, Louis Franck, or the consul of the United States Mordecai Manuel Noah.

On the socio-economic level, the Jewish population was very heterogeneous. In the country ports, Jewish merchants of European origin control, along with Christians, the exchange of goods with foreign countries and dominated in more than half of trading houses operating in the country. Besides this wealthy class of traders and bankers, mainly Livornese, there was a middle class consisting of merchants and craftsmen.
These Jews played an important role in the retail trade, especially in the capital, where they were established in two souks of the medina: one specializing in colonial goods, hardware and articles from Paris and one specializing in draperies and English and French silk. Many were also engaging in artisanal activities, such as goldsmith, on which they had a monopoly, and also manufacture of clothes and footwear. They also served as lenders for peasants and artisans. In the rural areas of Nabeul, Gabes and Djerba, Jews were occupied in winemaking, growing date palms or fruit trees and stock raising.

There was also a poor class of Jews which were unable to survive without the charity organized by their community. Another group, the Bahusim (baḥuṣim, Hebrew for "outsiders") were semi-nomadic Jews in western Tunisia and eastern Algeria who led a tribal existence, like that of the Bedouin, and made their living from agriculture, peddling, and smithing. Jewish tribes of the region of Wargha, Kef Governorate, were Karaites and they have been nomad warriors. Their descendants, also named "Bahusim", remained in the eastern part of Algeria up to modern times.

European Influences 

The inclusion of Jews in the French Declaration of the Rights of Man and of the Citizen on September 27, 1791, and the Napoleonic decrees of 1808 aroused a certain sympathy for France among the Jews of Tunisia who were all subjects of the Bey. Thus, in 1809, the Spanish authorities reported that "the Jews are the most relentless partisans of Napoleon". It was even reported that some Jews, including the Granas, wore at that time a tricolor cockade, an act severely repressed by Hammuda ibn Ali, which refuses any attempt by France to take under its protection its Jewish subjects originating from the newly conquered by Napoleon Tuscany. The Article 2 of the Treaty of July 10, 1822, signed with the Grand Duchy of Tuscany, fixes the duration of the stay of the Granas in Tunisia at two years; they also passed under the sovereignty of the bey and were granted the same status as the Twansa.

At the same time, while Tunisia was gradually opening up to European influences and also undergoing its pressure, the sovereign Ahmed Bey the First inaugurated a policy of reforms. By virtue of an act correcting the Tunisian-Tuscan Treaty of 1822, signed on November 2, 1846, the Granas established in Tunisia after the treaty or those who came to settle there, obtained the right to retain their status as Tuscans without any time limit, which is not the case with the Granas who arrived before 1822. This provision encouraged many Granas of Italian origin to emigrate to Tunisia, where they constituted a foreign minority – 90 persons in 1848, reinforced by a few French and British Jews the protection of the Consul of Tuscany and settled in the Franc district of Tunis unlike the former Granas settled in the Hara; Those who arrived after the Italian unification also benefited from the application of this provision.

The Case of Sfez 
Political action is therefore seen as a means of putting an end to the exceptional status of Jews, constituting "a real break in the mental universe of Jewish communities, a rupture which breaks the old world of submission to the order of things". In 1853, the qaid of the Tunisian community, Nessim Samama, obtains the abolition of the chores to which his co-religionists were hitherto constrained.

Nevertheless, the Jews still had to pay the jizya and exceptional taxes claimed by the bey according to the needs and were also subject to discrimination. Jews had restricted dress code, according to which they were obliged to wear a black chechia (and not red, like the Muslims), a black or dark blue turban (and not white) and black shoes and not of bright color. They could not live outside their assigned neighborhoods and could not access real estate. Finally, when they were victims of vexations or violence, they did not receive reparation for the harm they have suffered.

Yet the relationship between Jews and Arabs changed dramatically from the middle of the century, due to the emergence of European colonial powers in Tunisia, and in France in particular. Indeed, they relied on the presence of Jews to promote their economic and commercial interests: the situation of these, often treated in an unfair way by the Tunisian courts, was used as a pretext for pressures on the bey. The Sfez affair in 1857 was an illustration of this new context and an opportunity for France and the United Kingdom to intervene on behalf of the defense of human rights and the struggle against absolutism and fanaticism in order to promote their interests.

Batou Sfez was a Jewish coachman at the service of the qaid of his community, Nassim Shamama. Following a traffic incident and an altercation with a Muslim, he was accused by Muslim of having insulted Islam; witnesses subsequently confirmed before a notary that they witnessed the scene. He was charged and convicted, according to Maliki law and despite his protestations, was sentenced by the Charaa court to a death penalty for blasphemy and beheaded with a saber sword on June 24, 1857. The sovereign Muhammad II ibn al-Husayn sought by this gesture to appease the rancor born of the execution of a Muslim accused of having killed a Jew and to prove that his justice treats his subjects fairly. Nevertheless, the severity of the punishment aroused great emotion in the Jewish community and among the consuls of France and the United Kingdom, Léon Roches and Richard Wood.
They then took advantage of it to exert pressure on the sovereign to embark on the path of liberal reforms similar to those promulgated in the Ottoman Empire in 1839. Moreover, the historian Ahmad ibn Abi Diyaf refers to the Tunisian Jews as "brothers in the homeland" (Ikhwanoun fil watan), although he accuses some of them of exaggerating to seek the protection of foreign consuls.

Mohammed Bey (1855–1881) 

During the long reign of Ahmed I Bey, the Jews enjoyed prosperity. His successor, Muhammad II ibn al-Husayn, inaugurated his reign in 1855 by abolishing the drudgery imposed upon the Jews; the qaid Joseph Scemama, with whom the bey was on very intimate terms, probably used his influence in behalf of his coreligionists. That year, however Mohammed Bey had a Jew named Batto Sfez executed for blasphemy. This execution aroused both Jews and Christians, and a deputation was sent to Napoleon III, asking him to intervene on their behalf. After two years of diplomatic negotiations a man-of-war was sent to enforce the demands of the French government. Mohammed Bey yielded, and issued a constitution, according to which all Tunisians, without distinction of creed, were to enjoy equal rights. The following articles of this constitution were of special interest to the Jews:

(§ 4) "No manner of duress will be imposed upon our Jewish subjects forcing them to change their faith, and they will not be hindered in the free observance of their religious rites. Their synagogues will be respected, and protected from insult."

(§ 6) "When a criminal court is to pronounce the penalty incurred by a Jew, Jewish assessors shall be attached to the said court."

The constitution was abrogated in 1864 in consequence of a revolution, which entailed great suffering on several Jewish communities, especially on that of Sfax; but the constant fear of foreign interference rendered the government very circumspect in its treatment of the Jews.

French Protectorate (1881–1956) 

The Jews of Tunisia felt much safer under the French protectorate. Contact with the French colonizers of Tunisia and the official presence of the French facilitated the assimilation of the Jews of Tunisia to French culture and their emancipation. Relying on the French revolutionary promise of Liberté, égalité, fraternité, the Jews hoped for a better life and were very receptive to the new French influences, though they had a Christian European source. For the generation born under the protectorate, the French language replaced Judeo-Arabic as the mother tongue of the Jews of French Tunisia. Additionally, more Jewish children began attending state schools throughout the country, which slowly lead to the diffusion of French culture and lifestyle within the Jewish community.

World War II 

Following the armistice in June 1940, the French Protectorate of Tunisia became part of Vichy France, the new French state ruled by collaborationist Marshal Philippe Pétain during France's occupation by Nazi Germany in World War II.  Under the rule of Pétain's collaborationist regime, the Jews of Vichy France and Vichy Tunisia were subjected to the two antisemitic Statut des Juifs (Jewish Statutes of October 3, 1940 and June 2, 1941), like the Jews in mainland France. Thus, discriminatory legislation defined the Jews, restricted them in the public service, in educational institutions and journalism, and in liberal professions (numerus clausus), counted them (Jewish census), and forced them to register their property to be subsequently aryanized. Consequently, Jews found themselves in their prior inferior status of "natives" and were impoverished. In August 1941, Xavier Vallat, head of the Office for Jewish Affairs (Commissariat Général aux Questions Juives), came from Metropolitan France to check the matter of the Jewish question. According to an article on the United States Holocaust Memorial Museum (USHMM) website "The history of the Holocaust in France's three North African territories (the three departments, 91, 92, and 93, in French Algeria, the two French protectorates of Morocco and Tunisia) is intrinsically tied to France's fate during this period." Holocaust scholar Martin Gilbert specified that the persecution of the Jews of French North Africa was an integral part of the Holocaust in France. French Morocco, Algeria and Tunisia in European territories in North Africa were considered part of Europe, as per a French and German document relevant to the Final Solution of the Jewish question.
The Jews of Vichy-French North Africa were relatively fortunate because their distance from Nazi concentration camps in Central and Eastern Europe permitted them to avoid the fate of their coreligionists in Metropolitan France. Immediately after the Allied landings in Vichy-Algeria and Vichy-Morocco, the Germans occupied Vichy Tunisia. On November 23, 1942, the Germans arrested Moises Burgel, the president of the Tunis Jewish community, and several other prominent Jews. The Jews of Vichy Tunisia were spared the mass deportations and mass murder that happened in Europe.

When the Nazis invaded Vichy Tunisia, the country was home to some 100,000 Jews. According to Yad Vashem, the Nazis imposed antisemitic policies including forcing Jews to wear the yellow badge (Star of David), fines, and confiscation of property. More than 5,000 Jews were sent to forced labor camps, where 265 are known to have been murdered. An additional 160 Jews of Tunisia living in France were sent to extermination camps in continental Europe.

Khaled Abdul-Wahab, a Muslim Arab of Vichy Tunisia, "the Arab Schindler," was the first Arab nominated for the Israeli Righteous Among the Nations award.

Post-War period and independence 

Between the end of World War II and the independence of Tunisia in March 1956, there was deep debate in the Tunisian Jewish community over Zionism. Anti-Jewish attacks in Hafsia in 1952 and conflict surrounding the independence struggle resulted in the first wave of emigration.

Following independence, a mixed picture emerged. On the one hand President Habib Bourguiba was seen as having the most liberal policy toward Jews among the Arabic-speaking nations, even going so far as to apologize to Tunisia's chief rabbi after violent anti-Jewish rioting in 1967. However, anti-Jewish decrees such as the abolition of Tunisia's Jewish Community Council in 1958 and the destruction of synagogues, Jewish cemeteries and Jewish quarters prompted more than 40,000 Jews to leave Tunisia between 1956 and 1967. By 1970, the majority of Tunisia's Jewish population had left the country. Emigrating Tunisian Jews primarily went to either Israel or France.

Arab Spring (post 2011) 

After the Tunisian Revolution, Ennahda became the leading political force in the country, elected as the largest party in the transitional government. The party's leader, Rashid Al-Ghannushi, sent a delegation to the Jews in Djerba, assuring them that they have nothing to worry about in a democratic Tunisia, where the Islamists would play a larger role. He even sent gifts to the Jewish nursing homes in Tunis. In November 2012, the community asked for the army's protection when a policeman was arrested after plotting to kidnap a young Jew for a ransom.

In 2011, the Israeli cabinet announced that it had allocated funding to help Tunisian Jews move to Israel due to growing manifestations of anti-Jewish and the difficult economic situation.

In January 2014, the Ennahda-led government voluntarily stepped aside and a transitional government, appointed to rule during the drafting of the new constitution until democratic elections would be held later in the year, took office. The new secular constitution for the first time explicitly protected not only freedom of religion, but freedom of conscience (freedom to become atheist, leave or change religions), and explicitly protected minorities such as Jews from official or unofficial discrimination. The new Tunisian constitution is the first of its kind in the Maghreb and the Arab world in embracing both Arabism and liberal secularism, and is seen as a model for other countries to adopt. The democratically elected constitutional committee, dominated by Ennahda, also rejected terms which would have forbidden relations with Israel. In 2022 Tunisia banned two films with Israeli actress Gal Gadot because she had served in the Israeli army.

Education and culture 
The Jewish community in Tunis operates three primary schools, two secondary schools and a yeshiva. The Jewish community in Djerba operates one kindergarten, two primary schools, two secondary schools and a yeshiva. There is also a Jewish primary school and synagogue in the coastal city of Zarzis.  The Jewish community also has two homes for the aged. Tunisia's first Jewish museum opened in 2012. In 2015, Tunis’ last kosher restaurant closed due to security concerns.

Synagogues 

The most famous synagogue in Tunisia is the El Ghriba synagogue in the village of Hara Sghira on Djerba. The current building was constructed in late 19th or early 20th century, but the site is believed to have had a synagogue on it for the past 1,900 years. Tunisian Jews have for centuries made an annual pilgrimage to the synagogue on Lag Ba'Omer. On April 11, 2002, a truck full of explosives was detonated close to the synagogue, killing 21 people (of whom 14 were German tourists and 2 Frenchmen), and wounding over 30, in the Ghriba Synagogue Attack. Al Qaeda claimed responsibility. Hayyim Madar was the chief rabbi until his death on December 3, 2004. Memorial services were held at the Beit Mordekhai Synagogue in La Goulette, Tunis, and the El Ghriba synagogue on the island of Djerba.

Tunisian Jews 
 Abba of Carthage, scholar 
 Max Azria, fashion designer
 Alain Boublil, French lyricist and librettist
 Michel Boujenah, French comic
 Serge Bramly, French writer and essayist
 Elsa Cayat, French psychoanalyst and columnist killed in the Charlie Hebdo shooting
 Claude Challe, French DJ and club owner
 Jacob Chemla, ceramic artist, businessman, and author
 Pierre Darmon, French tennis player
 Yehuda Getz, rabbi of the Western Wall in Jerusalem
 Mathilda Guez, Israeli politician
 Élie Kakou, French comic
 William Karel, French film director and author
 Élie Lellouche, French trainer of thoroughbred racehorses and jockeys
 Ofer Lellouche, Israeli painter, sculptor, etcher, and video artist
 Pierre Lellouche, French politician
 Hayyim Madar, Chief Rabbi of Tunisia
 Georges Adda, Tunisian politician
 Rene Traboulsi, Minister of Tourism in Tunisia
 Alain Mamou-Mani, French film producer and writer
 Menahem Mazuz, justice of the Supreme Court of Israel and former attorney general
 Albert Memmi, French author and essayist
 Nine Moati, French novelist
 Serge Moati, French artist, journalist, film director, and writer
 Kobi Oz, Israeli singer
 Victor Perez, boxer and World Flyweight Champion in 1931 and 1932 who was murdered in the Auschwitz death march
 Jacques Saada, Canadian politician and former cabinet minister
 Philippe Séguin, French politician and former president of the National Assembly and Court of Audit
Leïla Sfez (1874–1944), malouf singer
 Silvan Shalom, Israeli politician
 Joseph Sitruk, former Chief Rabbi of France
 David Tal, Israeli politician
 Haydée Tamzali, silent-era filmmaker
 Avraham Tiar, Israeli politician
 Aharon Uzan, Israeli politician
 Georges Wolinski, French cartoonist killed in the Charlie Hebdo shooting
 Ariel Zeitoun, French director, producer and screenwriter
 Nissim Zvili, Israeli politician and former ambassador to France

See also 
 Maghrebi Jews
 Islam and Judaism
 Jews outside Europe under Nazi occupation
 Or Torah Synagogue in Acre, Israel
 Antisemitism in the Arab world#Tunisia
 Geography of antisemitism#Tunisia

Further reading

References 

 
Tunisia
Tunisia